In mathematics, Serre's multiplicity conjectures, named after Jean-Pierre Serre, are certain purely algebraic problems, in commutative algebra, motivated by the needs of algebraic geometry. Since André Weil's initial definition of intersection numbers, around 1949, there had been a question of how to provide a more flexible and computable theory.

Let R be a (Noetherian, commutative) regular local ring and P and Q be prime ideals of R. In 1958, Serre realized that classical algebraic-geometric ideas of multiplicity could be generalized using the concepts of homological algebra. Serre defined the intersection multiplicity of R/P and R/Q by means of the Tor functors of homological algebra, as

If this idea were to work, however, certain classical relationships would presumably have to continue to hold. Serre singled out four important properties. These then became conjectures, challenging in the general case. (There are more general statements of these conjectures where R/P and R/Q are replaced by finitely generated modules: see Serre's Local Algebra for more details.)

Dimension inequality

 

Serre proved this for all regular local rings. He established the following three properties when R is either of equal characteristic or of mixed characteristic and unramified (which in this case means that characteristic of the residue field is not an element of the square of the maximal ideal of the local ring), and conjectured that they hold in general.

Nonnegativity

 

This was proven by Ofer Gabber in 1995.

Vanishing

If

 

then

 

This was proven in 1985 by Paul C. Roberts, and independently by Henri Gillet and Christophe Soulé.

Positivity

If

 

then

 

This remains open.

See also
Homological conjectures in commutative algebra

References
 
 
 
 
 
 

Commutative algebra
Intersection theory
Conjectures
Unsolved problems in mathematics